The Society for the Study of Black Religion is the oldest scholarly society dedicated to the study of the African-American religious experience. It is dedicated to "scholarly research and discussion about the religious experiences of Blacks."

History
The SSBR was founded in 1970 to support black religious scholars' critical inquiry into the foundations of black theology. The intellectual ferment which led to the group's founding began with Joseph B. Washington's publication of the seminal Black Religion in 1964, and continued with the publication of James H. Cone's Black Theology and Black Power in 1969.

The group chose the name "religion" rather than "theology" to avoid the constraints imposed by the narrower term. Charles Shelby Rooks, who would later become the first African-American head of a traditionally white-led seminary at the Chicago Theological Seminary, took a leading role in the founding and served as the SSBR's first elected president.

Presidents
Charles Shelby Rooks, 1970–1974
Lawrence Neale Jones, 1974–1977
Gayraud Wilmore, 1978–1980
Charles Shelby Rooks, 1980–1983
Gayraud Wilmore, 1984–1985
Charles H. Long, 1986–1989
Clarence G. Newsome, 1990–1991
Lillian Ashcraft-Eason, 1996–1999
Peter J. Paris, 2000–2003
Katie G. Cannon, 2004–2008
Lee H. Butler, Jr., 2008–2012
Emilie Townes, 2012–2016
Stephen G. Ray, Jr., 2016–present

Notable members
James H. Cone
Temba Mafico
Hugh R. Page, Jr.

See also
Black theology

References

External links

 

Religious studies
Academic organizations based in the United States
African studies